Treasure of Ruby Hills is a 1955 American black-and-white Western film directed by Frank McDonald and starring Zachary Scott, Carole Mathews, Barton MacLane, Dick Foran, and Lola Albright. The film is based on the story "The Rider of the Ruby Hills" by Louis L'Amour. He wrote the story under the pen-name Jim Mayo; the story was later expanded as the novel Where the Long Grass Blows in 1976.

Plot
The film is set in 1877 in Arlington. In the government-owned Ruby Hills Valley all the small landowners and ranchers are dispossessed of their property by two wealthy breeders, Chalk Reynolds and Walt Payne, who continue to wage war for total control of the area. Hills. Their henchmen do not hesitate to kill others to establish the supremacy of their leaders. Their war is turned upside down by the arrival of Ross Hayne, the son of a famous outlaw, who legally acquired part of the area with the only source of water capable of supplying the valley. When Hayne's partner is shot by Reynolds' henchman, Hayne goes to Ruby Hills for revenge. He discovers that a third man, Alan Doran, intends to take control of the place after the death of the two clans who are supposed to destroy each other. Hayne becomes involved in a deadly fight for land and water.

Cast

Zachary Scott as Ross Haney
Carole Mathews as Sherry Vernon
Barton MacLane as 'Chalk' Reynolds
Dick Foran as Alan Doran
Lola Albright as May
Gordon Jones as Jack Voyle
Raymond Hatton as Westbrook 'Scotty' Scott
Lee Van Cleef as Frank Emmett
Steve Darrell as Tom Hull
Charles Fredericks as Walt Payne

References

External links

1955 films
1950s English-language films
American Western (genre) films
Films based on works by Louis L'Amour
1955 Western (genre) films
Allied Artists films
Films directed by Frank McDonald
1950s American films
American black-and-white films